The 1965–66 season is the 86th season of competitive football by Rangers.

Overview
Rangers played a total of 51 competitive matches during the 1965–66 season.

Results
All results are written with Rangers' score first.

Scottish First Division

Scottish Cup

League Cup

Appearances

See also
 1965–66 in Scottish football
 1965–66 Scottish Cup
 1965–66 Scottish League Cup

References 

Rangers F.C. seasons
Rangers
Rangers